The South African ostrich (Struthio camelus australis), also known as the black-necked ostrich, Cape ostrich or southern ostrich is a subspecies of the common ostrich endemic to Southern Africa. It is widely farmed for its meat, eggs and feathers.

Habitat and distribution

The South African ostrich is found in South Africa, Namibia, Zambia, Zimbabwe, Angola and Botswana. It lives in south of the rivers Zambezi and Cunene.

Threats
It is farmed for its eggs, meat, leather and feathers in the Little Karoo area of Cape Province.

References

Struthio
Birds of Southern Africa
Birds described in 1868
Ostriches